Larry Jones Hopkins (October 25, 1933 – November 15, 2021) was an American businessman and politician who represented Kentucky's 6th congressional district in the United States House of Representatives from 1979 to 1993. He was the Republican nominee for governor of Kentucky in 1991 and lost to Brereton C. Jones. 

He was the father of actor Josh Hopkins.

Early life and education
Hopkins was born in Detroit and raised in Kentucky, the son of Louise Jones and James Glenn Hopkins. He attended public schools in Wingo, Kentucky and Murray State University.

Career 
Hopkins served in the United States Marine Corps from 1954 to 1956 and was a stockbroker with Hilliard Lyons. Hopkins served as Fayette County clerk before serving as the Kentucky House of Representatives from 1972 to 1976 and the Kentucky Senate from 1976 to 1978.

Congress 
He served in the United States House of Representatives from January 3, 1979, to January 3, 1993. During his tenure in Congress, Hopkins was a member of the United States House Committee on Armed Services, where he was a principal House cosponsor of the Goldwater–Nichols Act. In 1991, Hopkins ran for governor and defeated Larry Forgy in the Republican primary. Hopkins lost the general election to Brereton C. Jones who polled 540,468 votes (64.7%) to Hopkins'
294,452 (35.3%).

Hopkins did not seek re-election to the House in 1992, due in part to his loss in the race for governor and also because of his role in the House banking scandal. 

Hopkins was later exonerated of all charges.

Later career 
He later served as director of the Tobacco Division of the Agricultural Marketing Service in the G. H. W. Bush administration. He also worked as a lobbyist for Lott & Hopkins LLC Sonny Callahan & Associates LLC.

Personal life
Hopkins was married to Carolyn Pennebaker in 1956 and had two daughters and a son, Josh Hopkins, who later became an actor.

Death 
Hopkins died on November 15, 2021, at the age of 88.

References

External links

 

|-

1933 births
2021 deaths
American stockbrokers
County clerks in Kentucky
Republican Party Kentucky state senators
Republican Party members of the Kentucky House of Representatives
Military personnel from Detroit
Murray State University alumni
People from Graves County, Kentucky
Politicians from Detroit
Republican Party members of the United States House of Representatives from Kentucky
United States Marines

Members of Congress who became lobbyists